John Newland (November 23, 1917 – January 10, 2000) was an American director, actor, television producer, and screenwriter.

Early life and career
Born in Cincinnati, Ohio, Newland began his career in vaudeville while still in his teens.  After moving to New York City to study acting, he served in the United States Army Air Corps during World War II.  After the war, he signed with Warner Bros. but was limited to playing bit parts.  By the early 1950s, Newland began to focus solely on television roles, appearing in several episodes of Studio One, The Philco Television Playhouse,  Tales of Tomorrow, Kraft Television Theatre,  Robert Montgomery Presents and Schlitz Playhouse of Stars.

After directing episodes of Letter to Loretta in 1953, Newland went on to direct two episodes of Bachelor Father, Alfred Hitchcock Presents, and Thriller (US TV series).

His feature film directorial debut That Night! (1957) was nominated for two British Academy Film Awards.

In 1959, Newland became the host and director of the paranormal television series One Step Beyond. The series ended its run in 1961 and Newland later hosted its short-lived counterpart The Next Step Beyond in 1978.

Following the demise of his One Step Beyond, Newland directed one of the early 1964 The Man from U.N.C.L.E. episodes called "The Double Affair". His episode was given additional footage and released to cinemas as a motion picture titled The Spy with My Face.  In 1966 he produced and directed all episodes but one of the serious spy series The Man Who Never Was for which he also served as a writer.  Some episodes were strung together and released outside the United States as a film called Danger Has Two Faces.  He later directed episodes of The Sixth Sense, and Police Woman. In addition to acting, directing, and screenwriting, he produced several television movies.

Death
On January 10, 2000, Newland died of a stroke in Los Angeles, age 82.

Select filmography

Director

 That Night! (1957)
 The Thin Man (1 episode, 1958)
 Bachelor Father (5 episodes, 1958–1959)
 One Step Beyond (74 episodes, 1958–1961), also host
 Checkmate (1 episode, 1961)
 Thriller (4 episodes, 1961–1962)
 Route 66 (1 episode, 1962)
 Naked City (1 episode, 1962)
 The Defenders (1 episode, 1962)
 The Nurses (1 episode, 1963)
 The Man from U.N.C.L.E. (1 episode, 1964)
 The Man Who Never Was (TV series) (17 episodes 1966–1967)
 Star Trek (1 episode, 1967)
 Daniel Boone (3 episodes, 1967–1969)
 Hawaii Five-O (1 episode, 1970)
 The Name of the Game (1 episode, 1970)
 My Lover My Son (1970)
 The Legend of Hillbilly John (1972)
 Night Gallery (1 episode, 1972)
 The Sixth Sense (3 episodes, 1972)
 Don't be Afraid of the Dark (1973)
 Harry O (4 episodes, 1974–1975)
 Matt Helm (1 episode, 1975)
 Police Woman (13 episodes, 1974–1978)
 The Next Step Beyond (17 episodes, 1978–1979), also host.
 Wonder Woman (3 episodes, 1979)
 Flamingo Road (1 episode, 1981)
 Whiz Kids  (1 episode, 1983)

Actor
 Gentleman's Agreement (Uncredited, 1947)
 Nora Prentiss (Uncredited, 1947)
 13 Lead Soldiers (1948)
 Kraft Television Theatre (11 episodes, 1949–1953)
 Studio One (2 episodes, 1950–1951)
 Lights Out (4 episodes, 1950–1952)
 The Philco Television Playhouse (7 episodes, 1950–1952)
 The Web (3 episodes, 1950–1953)
 Armstrong Circle Theatre (3 episodes, 1951–1952)
 Lux Video Theatre (1 episode, 1952)
 Tales of Tomorrow (2 episodes, 1952–1953)
 Robert Montgomery Presents (36 episodes, 1952–1957)
 Schlitz Playhouse of Stars (5 episodes, 1953–1956)
 Letter to Loretta (13 episodes, 1956–1960)
 General Electric Theater (1 episode, 1958)
 The Detectives Starring Robert Taylor (1 episode, 1959)
 Thriller (Return of Andrew Bentley, 12-11-1961)
 Dr. Kildare (2 episodes, 1964)
 Night Gallery (1 episode, 1972)

Producer

 The Deadly Hunt (1971)
 Angel City (1980)
 The Five of Me (1981)
 The Execution (1985)
 Arch of Triumph (1985)
 Timestalkers (1987)
 Too Good to Be True (1988)

Award nominations

References

Hawkins, Lisa (FATE Magazine, January/February 2019 - Issue No.733). "Your Guide into the World of the Unknown - ONE STEP BEYONDs Creator, John Newland' - An Appreciation on His Centenary" (pp. 102–105), fatemag.com.

External links

1917 births
2000 deaths
American male film actors
American male stage actors
American male television actors
American television directors
Television producers from Ohio
American male screenwriters
Vaudeville performers
Male actors from Ohio
Male actors from Cincinnati
United States Army personnel of World War II
United States Army Air Forces soldiers
Film directors from Ohio
20th-century American male actors
20th-century American businesspeople
Screenwriters from Ohio
20th-century American male writers
20th-century American screenwriters